The Juri River is a trans-boundary river in India and Bangladesh. It rises in the Jampui Hills of the Indian state of Tripura. It enters Kulaura Upazila of Maulvi Bazar District of Bangladesh. The Juri Upazila is named after this river.

See also
List of rivers in Bangladesh

References

Rivers of Bangladesh
Rivers of Tripura
Kulaura Upazila
Juri Upazila
Rivers of India
Rivers of Sylhet Division
International rivers of Asia